Colette Baudoche is a 1909 novel by the French writer Maurice Barrès. It has the subtitle The Story of a Young Girl of Metz. The story is set in Lorraine right after the Franco-Prussian War 1870-1871, and focuses on the courtship between a young French woman and a German professor. The book was adapted into the 1994 short film Lothringen! by Straub-Huillet.

References

External links

 Colette Baudoche at Gallica 
 Colette Baudoche at Internet Archive 

Fiction set in the 1870s
1909 French novels
French novels adapted into films
French-language novels
Lorraine
Novels set in Germany
Novels by Maurice Barrès